Drillia inchoata is a species of sea snail, a marine gastropod mollusk in the family Drilliidae.

Description

Distribution
This species occurs in the Red Sea.

References

External links
 
 Janssen, Ronald, and Marco Taviani. "Taxonomic, ecological and historical considerations on the deep-water benthic mollusc fauna of the Red Sea." The Red Sea. Springer Berlin Heidelberg, 2015. 511-529.

inchoata
Gastropods described in 1903